An online database is a database accessible from a local network or the Internet, as opposed to one that is stored locally on an individual computer or its attached storage (such as a CD). Online databases are hosted on websites, made available as software as a service products accessible via a web browser. They may be free or require payment, such as by a monthly subscription. Some have enhanced features such as collaborative editing and email notification.

Cloud database
A cloud database is a database that is run on and accessed via the Internet, rather than locally. So, rather than keep a customer information database at one location, a business may choose to have it hosted on the Internet so that all its departments or divisions can access and update it. Most database services offer web-based consoles, which the end user can use to provision and configure database instances.

See also
 List of online databases
 Bibliographic databases
 Customer relationship management
 List of search engines
 List of academic databases and search engines

References

 
Types of databases